The 2017 Myanmar Futsal League (also known as the MFF Myanmar Futsal league for sponsorship reasons) was the top-tier professional Futsal league under Myanmar Football Federation (MFF) and Myanmar Beer (Myanmar)'s control. 2017 was the third season of the league, the top Myanmar professional Futsal league. A total of 10 teams were to compete in the league. The season was going to begin in March 2017.

Clubs 
Competition of 10 club in 2017 league
 MIC
 Myoma Futsal Club
 Pyay United
 Titans XII Futsal Club
 UM Futsal Club
 UPT Futsal Club
 Victoria University College Futsal Club
 White Colour Futsal Club
 Yamonnya  Futsal Club
 Yangon City Futsal Club

Result

League table
Below is the league table for 2017 season.

References

External links
 Myanmar Futsal League
 Myanmar Football Federation

Futsal in Myanmar